Demons of Insanity – Chapter Five is fifth studio album by the German power metal band Metalium, released in 2005.

Track listing
"Earth in Pain" (Lars Ratz, Michael Ehré) - 1:08
"Power of Time" (Ratz) - 4:13
"Demons of Insanity" (Matthias Lange, Ratz) - 4:29
"Cyber Horizon" (Ehré) - 5:24
"Ride On" (Ehré) - 6:02
"Endless Believer" (Ratz) - 8:06
"Sky Is Falling" (Ratz) - 4:28
"Destiny" (Ehré) - 4:47
"Mother Earth" (Henning Basse, Ratz) - 4:12
"Out of the Silence" (Ratz) - 4:32
"Atrocity" (Ratz) - 3:38
"Silence of the Night" (Ratz) - 6:02
"Visions of Paradise" (Ehré) - 4:02
"One by One" (Ehré) - 5:10
"Heavy Metal Crazy Night" - 4:06 (Japan bonus track)

Personnel
Band members
Henning Basse - lead and backing vocals  
Matthias Lange - guitars, backing vocals, co-producer, engineer
Lars Ratz - bass, guitar, backing vocals, producer, engineer, mixing, mastering
Michael Ehré - drums, guitar, backing vocals, co-producer

Additional musicians
Don Airey – keyboards, Moog synthesizer
Victor Bullock – guitar solo on track 10, engineer, editing, mixing
Markus Deml – guitar solo on tracks 7, 8, 9
Stefan Schlabritz - voice of the Metal God
Fred H. Ranzenberger - tenor

Production
 Christian Jungebluth – engineer, editing, mastering, drum engineering
 Florian Sommer – mixing
 Ralph Kessler – mastering
 Frans Mensink – cover art
 Friedrun Reinhold (German) – photography
 Kai Swillus – graphic design, booklet

References

External links
Metalium Official Website

Metalium albums
2005 albums